Sparkman may refer to:

Sparkman, Arkansas
Sparkman & Stephens
Stump v. Sparkman
Suicide of Bill Sparkman
Sparkman-Hillcrest Memorial Park Cemetery
Sparkman-Skelley Farm
Spark Man, a Robot Master in Mega Man 3

People with the surname
Sparkman (surname)

Schools
Sparkman High School
Sparkman High School (Arkansas)